"" ("White Blaze") is the second single from Japanese singer Yuki Saito. The single was released by Canyon Records on May 21, 1985, and was used as the theme song for the first Sukeban Deka television drama series on Fuji TV, in which Saito also played the main character, Saki Asamiya.

History
"" was released by Canyon Records on May 21, 1985. It was used as the theme song for the first Sukeban Deka television drama series on Fuji TV, and Saito was the first to play the main character in the series, Saki Asamiya (she was followed by Yoko Minamino in the second series and Yui Asaka in the third). While Saito's first release, "" is a pop song, "" is a rock song.

The title song was composed by Kōji Tamaki, and the B-side, "", was composed by Toshio Kamei. Both songs had lyrics written by Yukinojō Mori, and both were arranged by Satoshi Takebe.

Chart history

Track listing

Covers
The title sing was covered by Chiwa Saitō on the Rosario + Vampire Capu2 Character Song 2 single, released on October 29, 2008, and the Rosario + Vampire Idol Cover Best Album, released on February 18, 2009.

Notes

References

1985 singles
Japanese-language EPs
Japanese-language songs
Pony Canyon EPs
Yuki Saito (actress) songs
Japanese film songs
Songs written by Yukinojo Mori
1985 songs